Paradoxa is a genus of truffles in the family Tuberaceae. Originally described by the Italian botanist Oreste Mattirolo in 1935, the genus remained monotypic until a second species P. gigantospora was transferred from Tuber in 2009.  A third species, P. sinensis, was also described, representing the second species from China. P. sinensis differs from P. gigantospora by having a somewhat smaller fruit body, and differs from P. monospora by having yellowish to yellow-brown ascomata.

References

External links
 

Pezizales
Truffles (fungi)
Pezizales genera